Girl in the Mirror may refer to:

 "Girl in the Mirror", a song by BoA from the album The Face
 "Girl in the Mirror", a song by Cheryl from the album A Million Lights
 "Girl in the Mirror", a song by Bebe Rexha from the album UglyDolls
 "Girl in the Mirror", a song by Britney Spears from the album Oops!... I Did It Again
 "Girl in the Mirror", a song by Sophia Grace